Nihezi railway station is a level-four railway station located in Qianyang Township, Yi County, Jinzhou, Liaoning on the Jinzhou–Chengde railway. It is under the jurisdiction of China Railway Shenyang Group.

References 

Railway stations in Liaoning
Stations on the Jinzhou–Chengde railway